Her Second Husband is a 1917 American silent drama film directed by Dell Henderson and starring stage actress Edna Goodrich. It was produced and released by Mutual Film.

Cast
Edna Goodrich as Helen Kirby
William B. Davidson as John Kirby
Richard Neill as Richard Stone (credited as Richard R. Neill)
Miriam Folger as Celeste Valdane

Preservation
With no prints of Her Second Husband located in any film archives, it is a lost film.

References

External links

1917 films
American silent feature films
American black-and-white films
Lost American films
Mutual Film films
Films directed by Dell Henderson
Silent American drama films
1917 drama films
1917 lost films
Lost drama films
1910s American films